Blanka Lipińska (born 22 July 1985) is a Polish author best known for her erotic trilogy beginning with 365 Dni (365 Days). The first and second novels were adapted into the 2020 and 2022 films for which she co-wrote the screenplay and in which she has a cameo.

Biography
She was born in Puławy, southeastern Poland, to Małgorzata and Grzegorz Lipiński. After graduating from high school, she has finished cosmetology post-secondary school.

Prior to becoming an author, Lipińska worked as a therapist-hypnotist. She enjoys sports and fitness as well as sailing.

Works

Lipińska's three books are part of a trilogy. They were first published in Polish. An English translation of the first book was released in January 2021, with the second, That Day, due in 2022. The events in all three books occur within a few months of each other. Lipińska said that the inspiration for her erotic trilogy was Fifty Shades of Grey and a personal holiday trip to Sicily. She has described the works as semi-autobiographical.

 365 dni, Wydawnictwo Edipresse Polska, Warszawa 2018
 365 Days (English edition), 2021
 Ten dzień, Wydawnictwo Edipresse Polska, Warszawa 2018
 365 Days-This Day (English edition), 2021
 Kolejne 365 dni, Wydawnictwo Agora, Warszawa 2019

See also
Erotic literature

References

1985 births
Living people
Polish women novelists
People from Puławy
Women erotica writers